Salah Al Bahar (Arabic;صلاح البحر), born 1970) is an Iraqi singer and composer.

Biography 
Born in Baghdad in 1970, Salah started his career by composing songs for many Iraqi singers. He started his singing career after participating in the Amateur Corner program for Iraqi talent in 1994 and was able to succeed in the program. Then he produced his first song.

1992–present

Salah recorded 18 more successful musical albums and shot more than 117 music videos.

Discography

 1994 – Wun Treed Biaa
 1995 – Soutk Ana
 1996 – Mlit Ana
 1997 – Aker Zaman
 2000 – Manasekm
 2001 – Ank Yardony
 2002 – Alkatry
 2003– Entahena
 2004 – Anh Wleel 
 2005 – Dkoo Alkashb
 2008 – Ma Mrtah
 2013 – Haram
 2015 – Nadam
 2017 – Aksr Alkatr
 2018 – Asteheet
 2018 – Shasawelh

References 

1970 births
Living people
Musicians from Baghdad
21st-century Iraqi male singers
Iraqi composers
20th-century Iraqi male singers